France was ruled by monarchs from the establishment of the Kingdom of West Francia in 843 until the end of the Second French Empire in 1870, with several interruptions.

Classical French historiography usually regards Clovis I, king of the Franks, as the first king of France, however historians today consider that such a kingdom did not begin until the establishment of West Francia, during the dissolution of the Carolingian Empire.

Titles

The kings used the title "King of the Franks" until the late twelfth century; the first to adopt the title of "King of France" (Latin: Rex Franciae; French: roi de France) was Philip II in 1190 (r. 1180–1223), after which the title "King of the Franks" gradually lost ground. However, Francorum Rex continued to be sometimes used, for example by Louis XII in 1499, by Francis I in 1515, and by Henry II in about 1550; it was also used on coins up to the eighteenth century.

During the brief period when the French Constitution of 1791 was in effect (1791–1792) and after the July Revolution in 1830, the style "King of the French" (roi des Français) was used instead of "King of France (and Navarre)". It was a constitutional innovation known as popular monarchy which linked the monarch's title to the French people rather than to the possession of the territory of France.

With the House of Bonaparte, the title "Emperor of the French" (Empereur des Français) was used in 19th-century France (during the first and second French Empires) between 1804 and 1814, again in 1815, and between 1852 and 1870.

From the 14th century down to 1801, the English (and later British) monarch claimed the throne of France, though such claim was purely nominal excepting a short period during the Hundred Years' War when Henry VI of England had control over most of Northern France, including Paris. By 1453, the English had been mostly expelled from France and Henry's claim has since been considered illegitimate; French historiography commonly does not recognize Henry VI of England among the kings of France.

Frankish kings 
In August 843 AD, the Treaty of Verdun divided Francia into three kingdoms, one of which (Middle Francia) was short-lived; the other two evolved into France (West Francia) and, eventually, Germany (East Francia). By this time, the eastern and western parts of the land had already developed different languages and cultures.

Carolingian dynasty (843–887) 

The Carolingians were a Frankish noble family with origins in the Arnulfing and Pippinid clans of the 7th century AD. The family consolidated its power in the 8th century, eventually making the offices of mayor of the palace and dux et princeps Francorum hereditary and becoming the real powers behind the Merovingian kings. The dynasty is named after one of these mayors of the palace, Charles Martel, whose son Pepin the Short dethroned the Merovingians in 751 and, with the consent of the Papacy and the aristocracy, was crowned King of the Franks. Under Charles the Great (r. 768–814), better known as "Charlemagne", the Frankish kingdom expanded deep into Central Europe, conquering Italy and most of modern Germany. He was succeeded by his son Louis the Pious (r. 814–840), who eventually divided the kingdom between his sons. His death, however, was followed by a 3-year-long civil war that ended with the Treaty of Verdun. Modern France developed from West Francia, while East Francia became the Holy Roman Empire and later Germany.

Robertian dynasty (888–898)

Carolingian dynasty (898–922)

Robertian dynasty (922–923)

Bosonid dynasty (923–936)

Carolingian dynasty (936–987)

Capetian dynasty (987–1792) 

The Capetian dynasty is named for Hugh Capet, a Robertian who served as Duke of the Franks and was elected King in 987. Except for the Bonaparte-led Empires, every monarch of France was a male-line descendant of Hugh Capet. The kingship passed through patrilineally from father to son until the 14th century, a period known as Direct Capetian rule. Afterwards, it passed to the House of Valois, a cadet branch that descended from Philip III. The Valois claim was disputed by Edward III, the Plantagenet king of England who claimed himself as the rightful king of France through his french mother; the two houses fought the Hundred Years' War over the issue, and with Henry VI of England being for a time partially recognized as King of France. The Valois line died out in the late 16th century, during the French Wars of Religion, to be replaced by the distantly related House of Bourbon, which descended through the Direct Capetian Louis IX. The Bourbons would rule France until deposed in the French Revolution, though they would be restored to the throne after the fall of Napoleon. The last Capetian to rule would be Louis Philippe I, king of the July Monarchy (1830–1848), a member of the cadet House of Bourbon-Orléans.

House of Capet (987–1328) 

The House of Capet are also commonly known as the "Direct Capetians".

House of Valois (1328–1589) 

The death of Charles IV started the Hundred Years' War between the House of Valois and the House of Plantagenet (whose claim was taken up by the cadet branch known as the House of Lancaster) over control of the French throne. The Valois claimed the right to the succession by male-only primogeniture through the ancient Salic Law, having the closest all-male line of descent from a recent French king. They were descended from the third son of Philip III, Charles, Count of Valois. The Plantagenets based their claim on being closer to a more recent French king, Edward III of England being a grandson of Philip IV through his mother, Isabella. The two houses fought the Hundred Years War to enforce their claims; the Valois were ultimately successful, and French historiography counts their leaders as rightful kings. One Plantagenet, Henry VI of England, did enjoy de jure control of the French throne following the Treaty of Troyes, which formed the basis for continued English claims to the throne of France until 1801. The Valois line would rule France until the line became extinct in 1589, in the backdrop of the French Wars of Religion. As Navarre did not have a tradition of male-only primogeniture, the Navarrese monarchy became distinct from the French with Joan II, a daughter of Louis X.

House of Valois-Orléans (1498–1515)

House of Valois-Angoulême (1515–1589)

House of Bourbon (1589–1792) 

The Valois line looked strong on the death of Henry II, who left four male heirs. His first son, Francis II, died in his minority. His second son, Charles IX, had no legitimate sons to inherit. Following the premature death of his fourth son Hercule François and the assassination of his third son, the childless Henry III, France was plunged into a succession crisis over which distant cousin of the king would inherit the throne. The best claimant, King Henry III of Navarre, was a Protestant, and thus unacceptable to much of the French nobility. Ultimately, after winning numerous battles in defence of his claim, Henry converted to Catholicism and was crowned as King Henry IV, founding the House of Bourbon. This marked the second time the thrones of Navarre and France were united under one monarch; as different inheritance laws had caused them to become separated during the events of the Hundred Years Wars. The House of Bourbon would be overthrown during the French Revolution and replaced by a short-lived republic.

Long 19th-century (1792–1870) 

The period known as the "long nineteenth century" was a tumultuous time in French politics, the period is generally considered to have begun with the French Revolution, which deposed and then executed Louis XVI. Royalists continued to recognize his son, the putative king Louis XVII as ruler of France, however Louis was under arrest by the government of the Revolution, and died in captivity having never ruled. The republican government itself went through several changes in form and constitution until France was declared an empire following the ascension of the First Consul Napoleon Bonaparte as Emperor Napoleon I. Napoleon himself would be overthrown twice following military defeats during the Napoleonic Wars. After the Napoleonic period followed two different royal governments, the Bourbon Restoration, which was ruled successively by two younger brothers of Louis XVI, and the July Monarchy, ruled by Louis Philippe I, a distant cousin who claimed descent from Louis XIII. The French Revolution of 1848 brought an end to the monarchy again, instituting a brief Second Republic that lasted only four years before its President declared himself Emperor Napoleon III, who would himself be deposed and replaced by the Third Republic, and ending monarchic rule in France for good.

House of Bourbon, claimant (1792–1804)

House of Bonaparte, First French Empire (1804–1814)

House of Bourbon (1814–1815)

House of Bonaparte, Hundred Days (1815)

Bourbon Restoration (1815–1830)

House of Bourbon-Orléans, July Monarchy (1830–1848) 

The Bourbon Restoration came to an end with the July Revolution of 1830 which deposed Charles X and replaced him with Louis Philippe I, a distant cousin with more liberal politics. Charles X's son Louis signed a document renouncing his own right to the throne only after a 20-minute argument with his father. Because he was never crowned he is disputed as a genuine king of France. Louis's nephew Henry was likewise considered by some to be Henry V but the new regime did not recognise his claim and he never ruled.

House of Bonaparte, Second French Empire (1852–1870) 

The French Second Republic lasted from 1848 to 1852, when its president, Charles-Louis-Napoléon Bonaparte, was declared Emperor of the French under the regnal name of Napoleon III. He would later be overthrown during the events of the Franco-Prussian War, becoming the last monarch to rule France.

Later pretenders
Various pretenders descended from the preceding monarchs have claimed to be the legitimate monarch of France, rejecting the claims of the president of France and of one another. These groups are:
 Legitimist claimants to the throne of France: descendants of the Bourbons. Unionists recognized the Orléanist claimant after 1883.
 Blancs d'Espagne: descendants of Louis XIV, claiming precedence over the House of Bourbon-Orléans by virtue of primogeniture.
 Orléanist claimants to the throne of France: descendants of Louis-Phillippe, himself descended from a junior line of the Bourbon dynasty, rejecting all heads of state since 1848.
 Bonapartist claimants to the throne of France: descendants of Napoleon I and his brothers, rejecting all heads of state 1815–48 and since 1870.
 English claimants to the throne of France: kings of England and later of Great Britain (renounced by Hanoverian King George III upon union with Ireland in 1800).
 Jacobite claimants to the throne of France: senior heirs-general of Edward III of England and thus his claim to the French throne, also claiming England, Scotland, and Ireland.

Timeline

See also
Family tree of French monarchs
Family tree of French monarchs (simplified)
Style of the French sovereign
English claims to the French throne
List of French royal consorts
List of heirs to the French throne
List of presidents of France

Notes

Coronations

References

Citations

Main bibliography 

 
 
 
 Jacquin, Emmanuel (2000), Les Tuileries, Du Louvre à la Concorde, Editions du Patrimoine, Centres des Monuments Nationaux, Paris.

Secondary bibliography

Further reading 

 
 
 
 
 

French monarchs
France
Monarch